Hardmead Lock (No3) is a lock on the River Lee Navigation at Great Amwell close to the town of Ware. 

The lock has a reputation as being difficult to negotiate.

Location 
The lock-keeper's cottage stands on an island formed by a section of the River Lee Flood Relief Channel which flows through an automatic sluice gate adjacent to the lock. 

To the east of the lock is the Amwell Quarry nature reserve a Site of Special Scientific Interest (SSSI)   and a section of the Old River Lea known as the Amwell Magna Fishery where it merges with its tributary the River Ash . 

The New River flows close by to the west.

Public access
The lock is located on the River Lee Navigation towpath which is part of the Lea Valley Walk

Public transport 
Ware railway station

References

External links 
 Hardmead Lock- a history

Locks in Hertfordshire
Locks of the Lee Navigation
Ware, Hertfordshire